Arab Business Leaders (known also as ABL) is an independent business non-profit organization founded by Houssam Nasrawin. ABL has representatives and partners in 37 countries in Africa, Asia, Europe, and Middle East.

Since its inception in 2011, the organization has been active to encourage international initiatives with the Middle-East mainly by encouraging entrepreneurship initiatives and supporting business initiatives in the region.

Entrepreneurship programs
ABL has launched in 2015, an investment platform to support entrepreneurs from the MENA region to develop their projects
Entrepreneurship programs also include an incubator meant to support women entrepreneurs in the Arab countries.

Connecting entrepreneurs
ABL’s first mission is to support Arab entrepreneurs and governments to connect to those in the rest of the World. This is mainly done through roadshows of business delegations or business events. ABL has organized more than 35 events since 2011 in Dubai, Abu Dhabi, Amman, Doha, Paris, Luxembourg, London and Brussels.

References

External links
 
 ABL president received by former French president Nicolas Sarkozy
 ABL roadshow in Bahrain
 ABL and BDB signed MOU
 Interview ABL president on TV5
 Interview ABL president in Le Figaro
 ABL Conference with BPIFrance and GCPME
 ABL on Emirati TV 
 Arab Business LEADERS and CEO CLUBS Network signed MOU in Dubai
 "Dubai, the new bridge between the Middle East and Africa" the role of ABL
 ABL to bridge UAE and Europe
 ABL conference: French companies gain insight into Sharjah's investment potential

Organizations established in 2015